James C. Field (April 24, 1863 in Philadelphia – May 13, 1953 in Atlantic City, New Jersey) was a Major League Baseball first baseman for five seasons.

His brother, Sam Field, also played professional baseball.

References

External links

1863 births
1953 deaths
Major League Baseball first basemen
Rochester Broncos players
Columbus Buckeyes players
Baltimore Orioles (AA) players
Pittsburgh Alleghenys players
Washington Senators (1891–1899) players
Minor league baseball managers
Savannah (minor league baseball) players
Newark Little Giants players
Newark Trunkmakers players
Buffalo Bisons (minor league) players
Albany Senators players
Erie Blackbirds players
Rochester Patriots players
Ottawa Wanderers players
Syracuse Stars (minor league baseball) players
Newark Colts players
Harrisburg Ponies players
Philadelphia Athletics (minor league) players
Baseball players from Philadelphia
19th-century baseball players